Ronald Desruelles (14 February 1955 – 1 November 2015) was a Belgian athlete. He started as a long jumper, and achieved a personal best of 8.08 in 1979, a national record that stood for 17 years. He then concentrated on the short sprints, and won numerous medals in 60 metres. With 6.57 seconds in 1986 he was ranked third on the indoor top performers list that season. He lost a gold medal at the 1980 European Indoor Championships, however, because of a doping offense. Desruelles won the Belgian 100 metres championships 7 times. He also won the 200 in 1985. In the 1986 European championships in Stuttgart he reached the 100 m semi-final.

Desruelles was born in Antwerp. His brother Patrick Desruelles competed in the men's pole vault. Ronald was found dead in a hotel in Thailand on 1 November 2015, having committed suicide after the failure of his business.

Achievements

Notes: 
Desruelles was the original winner of the long jump at the 1980 European Indoor Championship before being disqualified for a doping violation.
Desruelles won his first round heat at the 1984 Olympics but withdrew from the second round.

References

External links

Ronald Desruelles' profile at Sports Reference.com

1955 births
2015 suicides
Belgian male sprinters
Belgian male long jumpers
Athletes (track and field) at the 1976 Summer Olympics
Athletes (track and field) at the 1984 Summer Olympics
Olympic athletes of Belgium
World Athletics Championships athletes for Belgium
World Athletics Indoor Championships medalists
Sportspeople from Antwerp
Doping cases in athletics
Belgian sportspeople in doping cases
Suicides by hanging in Thailand